The Robert J. Trumpler Award of the Astronomical Society of the Pacific is given annually to a recent recipient of the Ph.D degree whose thesis is judged particularly significant to astronomy. The award is named after Robert Julius Trumpler, a notable Swiss-American astronomer (1886–1956).

Previous award winners
Source: ASP

See also

 List of astronomy awards
 Prizes named after people

References

Astronomy prizes
Awards established in 1973
1973 establishments in the United States